1955 Emperor's Cup Final was the 35th final of the Emperor's Cup competition. The final was played at Nishinomiya Stadium in Hyōgo on May 4, 1955. All Kwangaku won the championship.

Overview
All Kwangaku won the championship, by defeating Chudai Club 4–3. All Kwangaku was featured a squad consisting of many international footballers, Tomohiko Ikoma, Ryuzo Hiraki, Hiroaki Sato, Shigeo Sugimoto, Takeshi Inoue, Masanori Tokita, Arawa Kimura and Takashi Tokuhiro.

Match details

See also
1955 Emperor's Cup

References

Emperor's Cup
Emperor's Cup Final
Emperor's Cup Final